Alan McLennan (born 27 November 1936) is a former Australian racing cyclist. He finished in second place in the Australian National Road Race Championships in 1962.

References

External links

1936 births
Living people
Australian male cyclists
Place of birth missing (living people)